Cliff Island is a narrow cliffed island at the south side of Mutton Cove, lying immediately south of Upper Island and  west of Prospect Point, off the west coast of Graham Land, Antarctica. It was charted and named by the British Graham Land Expedition under John Rymill, 1934–37.

See also 
 List of Antarctic and sub-Antarctic islands

References 

Islands of Graham Land
Graham Coast